State Route 304 (SR 304) is a state highway in Meigs and Roane counties in the eastern portion of the U.S. state of Tennessee. It connects Decatur to Kingston via SR 68 and Ten Mile. It provides access to many marinas and lakeside homes along Watts Bar Lake.

Route description

SR 304 begins in Meigs County in Decatur at SR 58 and heads north and after 2.4 miles it begins to follow closely to the Tennessee River and Chickamauga Lake (and past Watts Bar Dam, Watts Bar Lake). It passes close to Watts Bar Dam and across the river is Watts Bar Nuclear Generating Station.

In the same area as the dam, SR 304 junctions with SR 68 and begins a 0.6-mile-long wrong-way concurrency. Then it turns east on SR 68 toward Sweetwater to a junction where SR 304 turns northward and SR 68 continues southeast.
 
SR 304 again begins to follow closely to the Tennessee River and enters the community of Ten Mile and passes some businesses, marinas and the community's post office.

It then leaves the river for a short distance and enters Roane County and continues to follow the river, until it comes to an end at SR 58 south of Kingston and north of Ten Mile.

Major junctions

References

304
Transportation in Meigs County, Tennessee
Transportation in Roane County, Tennessee
Roane County, Tennessee
Meigs County, Tennessee